The 1990–91 season was Atlético Madrid's 60th season since foundation in 1903 and the club's 56th season in La Liga, the top league of Spanish football. Atlético competed in La Liga, the Copa del Rey, and the UEFA Cup.

Summary 
In his third campaign as President, Jesus Gil reinforced the squad with German playmaker Bernd Schuster from Real Madrid after the talented midfielder was discarded by John Benjamin Toshack during summer. On the bench was Ovejero only one round and Ivić managed the rest of the campaign, driving the club to a decent second spot ten points behind Champion FC Barcelona. After 18 undefeated matches, including a massive 13 clean sheet games (Abel Resino held the record for the longest clean sheet in La Liga at 1,275 minutes, was also the European record in a single season during 18 years until 2009, when Edwin van Der Sar from Manchester United broke it against Fulham) on 7 April 1991 the team was a mere 4 points behind  FC Barcelona on the race for the league title, then, the squad collapsed since the 31 round only clinching three points over the final 9 rounds shattered its options for the trophy. It was bizarre a 2-2 match against Osasuna, with a massive number of 4 penalties failed. The last league match was controversial, Español was needed to win the game in order to avoid Relegation to Segunda Division meanwhile, according to Paulo Futre, President Jesus Gil asked not to win the match against Periquitos in exchange for soon-to-be Atletico's head coach Luis Aragones then Español manager and the transfer of Rodax.

In Copa del Rey the squad defeated Real Madrid in eightfinals and FC Barcelona in semifinals advancing to the Final against underdogs Real Club Deportivo Mallorca, clinching its 7th trophy after extra time. In UEFA Cup the squad early was eliminated in first round by Timișoara.

Squad

Transfers

Winter

Competitions

La Liga

League table

Results by round

Matches

Copa del Rey

Eightfinals

Quarterfinals

Semifinals

Final

UEFA Cup

Statistics

Players statistics

Squad statistics

References

External Links 
 Schedule of season 1990-1991.
 Matches of season 1990-1991.

Atlético Madrid seasons
Atlético Madrid